{{Speciesbox
|image = Helianthus occidentalis compressed.JPG
|genus = Helianthus
|species = occidentalis
|authority = Riddell
|synonyms_ref = 
|synonyms = *Helianthus dowellianus M.A.Curtis
Helianthus illinoensis Gleason <ref>[http://www.tropicos.org/ImageFullView.aspx?imageid=30266 photo of herbarium specimen at Missouri Botanical Garden, collected in Illinois in 1904, type specimen of Helianthus illinoensis, syn of Helianthus occidentalis']</ref>
}}Helianthus occidentalis, the fewleaf sunflower or western sunflower, is a species of sunflower native to the Eastern and Central United States. It grows mostly in the Great Lakes Region and in the Ozarks, with additional populations scattered as far as Massachusetts, Texas, and the Florida Panhandle.Helianthus occidentalis differs from other, similar species by its sparse leaves, most of which are crowded around the lower part of the stem. This perennial plant reaches heights from 2 to 5 ft (60–150 cm). It produces one to several yellow flower heads, each with 8-14 ray florets surrounding more than 50 disc florets.

The word occidentalis means "western" in Latin. The plant was first described in 1836, when the Great Lakes Region was considered the western part of the United States.

SubspeciesHelianthus occidentalis subsp. occidentalis - most of species rangeHelianthus occidentalis subsp. plantagineus'' (Torr. & A.Gray) Shinners - Texas, Arkansas

References

External links

occidentalis
Flora of the United States
Plants described in 1836